The Sylvan Adams Bonei Zion Prize (Translation: Builders of Zion Prize) is awarded annually by the Nefesh B'Nefesh organization to formally recognize the achievements of outstanding Anglo immigrants and their contribution to the State of Israel. A Prize is awarded in each of the following categories: "Culture, Art & Sports", Young Leadership, Science an Medicine, Israel Advocacy, Business & Technology, Education, Community & Non-profit, Lifetime Achievement.

Prize recipients

External links

References

Israeli awards
Awards established in 2013
Lists of Israeli award winners
Israeli culture
Arts awards in Israel
Israeli science and technology awards
2013 establishments in Israel